Purba may refer to:

Deep Roy (born 1957), a Kenyan-born Indian actor, born Mohinder Purba
Kīla (Buddhism) - a ceremonial knife or dagger, also known as a "Phurba"
Pipra (Purba), a village in Nepal